Bhagavathi is a small town in Arghakhanchi District in the Lumbini Zone of southern Nepal. At the time of the 1991 Nepal census, the town had a population of 4418 living in 842 houses. At the time of the 2001 Nepal census, the population was 4543, of which 59% was literate.

References

भगवती गा.बि.स दार्चुला जिल्लामा पनि छ | दार्चुला जिल्लाको भगवती गा.बि.समा पनि अर्घाखाँची जिल्लाको जानकारी नै राखिएको छ |

Bhagavathi is a VDC of Darchula District in the Mahakali Zone of Farwestern Nepal.

Populated places in Arghakhanchi District